Deneb is a supergiant star in the Cygnus constellation, also known as α Cygni.

Deneb can also refer to:
 Deneb Kaitos, the star β Ceti or the star ι Ceti
 Deneb el Okab, a proper name applied to two different stars in the constellation Aquila
 Deneb Algedi, the star δ Capricorni
 SS Deneb, a German cargo steamship
 Deneb Robotics, a 3D factory simulation software company
 Deneb Karentz, a biology professor at the University of San Francisco
 Deneb, a Phenom II processor core

See also
 Denebola, the star β Leonis